Tomáš Koplík (born 21 July 1986) is a Czech slalom canoeist who has competed at the international level since 2004, together with his C2 partner Jakub Vrzáň.

He won two medals in the C2 team event at the ICF Canoe Slalom World Championships with a silver in 2010 and a bronze in 2014. He also won six medals in the same event at the European Championships (2 golds, 2 silvers and 2 bronzes).

World Cup individual podiums

References

 2010 ICF Canoe Slalom World Championships 11 September 2010 C2 men's team final results. - accessed 11 September 2010.

External links
 

Czech male canoeists
Living people
1986 births
Medalists at the ICF Canoe Slalom World Championships